The Throw stick hieroglyph of ancient Egypt is an old hieroglyph that dates from the Predynastic Period; it is from the assemblage of hieroglyphs used on the ornamental, or ceremonial cosmetic palettes. It is used on the palettes both as a throwing-stick weapon in the animal hunt being portrayed-(the Hunters Palette), as well as on certain palettes, as a determinative referring to a "foreigner", or "foreign territory".

Ancient Libya, just northwestwards from Lower Egypt, and the Libyans were thought to be the first land portrayed, as well as the savannah-desert land hunters.

Linguistic use of 'throw stick'

From the earliest Predynastic Ancient Egypt upon the cosmetic palettes, the throwing stick was used to refer to foreigners, or to foreign territory. This use persisted for three millennia till the end of Ancient Egypt and the use of hieroglyphs.

In the Ancient Egyptian language however, the main use of the throwing stick is a determinative, first for foreign territory, but also for actions involved with 'defeating', submission, or the unfortunate. The various words have many spellings, but fall under words meaning: "throw stick", "throw", and "to create". For the composite bird hieroglyph, "to alight", "flutter", "hover"; also "create"-(genetic lineage in the Rosetta Stone).

Rosetta Stone usage
Three uses of the "composite bird-hieroglyph" occur in the Rosetta Stone; in line R-5-(twice) it refers to the ancestry of Pharaoh Ptolemy V Epiphanes, and presumably his appearing-(epiphanous title) ("Epiphanous Euchaistos"); this is his 'alighting' presumably. The line actually talks of his genetic lineage: "....and the [deeds] of the two gods-lovers of Fathers (Philopatores) who begot him, and of the two Well-doing-(Good Deeds) gods (Euergetai) who caused to exist-(1st hieroglyph), [those who] created-(2nd hieroglyph) him, ...."

Elsewhere, for the "Throw-stick hieroglyph", when fashioning a statue by the priests, (lines R7, 9) the use of throw stick determinative: ...."and shall be placed on the side upper of the rectangle, which is on the outside of crowns this, opposite-(2 stick determinatives), to double crown this....". The word seems to refer to the fact that the throw stick can return-(boomerang), and thus the word opposite.

Iconographic use: from palettes to the marshland
Though the origin of the throw stick came from the hunters, as represented on the Predynastic cosmetic palettes, one major use of the throw stick in iconography was the tomb reliefs. Since the Ancient Egyptians were attending to their affairs in the afterlife, the tomb scenes for men often showed swamp scenes, with ducks, fish, other animals, and often the spouse accompanying the deceased being honored; the living deceased men were shown as joyful hunters bringing down the bountiful ducks of the swamps.

The famous Narmer Palette
The Narmer Palette shows the Horus-falcon upon the defeated people of the Lower Egypt Delta. It is a stylized version of the throw-stick, as the end is hooked within the mouth of a human head, representing the submission of the Delta peoples.

Throw stick as part of composite hieroglyphs

The throw stick is used in a composite-formed hieroglyph, not on the standard Gardiner's Sign List. A bird alighting-(perching on a branch), or fluttering is Gardner, bird series, G41. The variant shows a vertical 'branch', indicated with the "throw stick"; the bird is shown attached to the branch.

See also
Gardiner's Sign List - Warfare, hunting, and butchery
List of Egyptian hieroglyphs

Gallery

References

Budge.  The Rosetta Stone, E.A.Wallace Budge, (Dover Publications), c 1929, Dover edition(unabridged), 1989. (softcover)

Egyptian hieroglyphs: warfare-hunting-butchery

Egyptian hieroglyphs: arts and trades